Char siu bao is a Cantonese barbecue-pork-filled baozi (bun). The buns are filled with barbecue-flavored cha siu pork. They are served as a type of dim sum during yum cha and are sometimes sold in Chinese bakeries. Cha siu refers to the pork filling; the word bao means "bun".

Varieties
There are two major kinds of cha siu bao: the traditional steamed version is called  or simply , while the baked variety is usually called . Steamed cha siu bao has a white exterior, while the baked variety is browned and glazed.

Cantonese cuisine
Although visually similar to other types of steamed baozi, the dough of steamed cha siu bao is unique since it makes use of both yeast and baking powder as leavening. This unique mix of leavening gives the dough of cha siu bao the texture of a slightly dense, but fine soft bread.

Encased in the center of the bun is tender, sweet, slow-roasted pork tenderloin. This cha siu is diced, and then mixed into a syrupy mixture of oyster sauce, hoisin sauce, roasted sesame seed oil, rice vinegar, shaoxing wine or dry sherry, soy sauce, sugar, and cornstarch.

Philippine cuisine

Siopao, literally meaning "hot bun", is the Philippine indigenized version of baozi. A common variant of the siopao, the siopao asado, is derived from the char siu bao and has a filling (asado) which uses similar ingredients to char siu. It differs in that the Filipino asado is a braised dish, not grilled, and is more similar in cooking style to the Hokkien tau yu bak (豆油肉). It is slightly sweeter than char siu and can also be cooked with chicken. Siopao is also typically much larger than the char siu bao or the baozi.

Polynesian cuisine

In Hawaii, the item is called manapua. Its name is a shortening of the Hawaiian mea ono puaa, meaning "delicious pork thing". On the US mainland, the Chinese term is commonly used. The Chinese immigrants brought this dim sum item with them when they were brought over as plantation workers. In Samoa and American Samoa, the item is referred to as keke pua'a, literally meaning "pig cake".

This food usually consists of a white bun with a dark pink-colored diced pork filling.  The Hawaiian version of the cha siu bao tends to be larger than its Chinese cousin and can be either steamed or baked. In Hawaii starting in the plantation era, manapua sellers were and still are a common occurrence and have even become  iconic symbols of Hawaii. The red pork filling's dark pink color comes from marinating the pork with a very small amount of saltpeter prior to slow roasting. The bun is occasionally baked, but more frequently is steamed when it is made.  Manapua has come to mean any meat-filled or bean-paste-filled bun made with the same dough as described above, including locally created versions with hot dogs, curry chicken, kalua pig, and even ube (purple yam), which is a popular vegetarian version of the manapua.  In Hawaii, freshly prepared or prepackaged frozen manapua may be found in dedicated bakeries, restaurants, and chain convenience stores.

In addition to existing in Hawaii, bao buns are also commonly found in Tahiti, French Polynesia. In Tahiti they are called chao pao, and were brought to the islands during the Chinese migration wave dating back to the mid 1800s. Despite its long Tahitian history, the chao pao retains all its authentic characteristics. The chao pao is a local favorite and is commonly sold all over the island in Chinese mom-and-pop stores as a breakfast item.

Vietnamese cuisine
In Vietnam, the item is called xíu páo. It's originating from Guangdong and Chaozhou following a fairly large overseas Chinese community living in Hakka street in Nam Dinh, Vietnam. Ingredients for baking mainly include flour, meat, eggs, flour, lard and some typical spices depending on how each family's family is made. To make delicious cakes, people often marinate pork tenderloin with minced garlic, five flavors, oyster oil, honey and then baked until it turns the color of the cockroach and is fragrant. Char siu meat is cut with pomegranate seeds mixed with wood ear, pork fat and half a boiled chicken egg. The word "xíu páo" is considered to be transliterated Cantonese or Hokkien.

See also

 Bánh bao (Vietnam)
 Dim sum
 Goubuli (aka "Go Believe")
 Jjinppang/Hoppang (South Korea)
 List of buns
 List of pork dishes
 List of snack foods
 List of steamed foods
 List of stuffed dishes
 Nikuman (Japan)
 Siopao (Philippines)

References

Barbecue
Cantonese cuisine
Cantonese words and phrases
Chinese breads
Dim sum
Hawaiian cuisine
Samoan cuisine
French Polynesian cuisine
Polynesian Chinese cuisine
Mauritian cuisine
Hong Kong breads
Steamed buns
Stuffed dishes
Chinese pork dishes